The Airshow of the Cascades is an annual event held in August at the Madras Municipal Airport in Central Oregon. It started in a field outside of Madras in the 1970s and draws around 10,000 people with around 150 aircraft on display.

History
The show began in the late 1970s at rancher Ron Ochs's alfalfa field near Madras. In 2000, the airshow moved to the Madras Municipal Airport. Planes from the Erickson Aircraft Collection became part of the show in 2014 when a new museum housing the collection opened at the Madras Airport.

There was no airshow in 2020.

References

External links

Air shows in the United States
1970s establishments in Oregon
Madras, Oregon
Tourist attractions in Jefferson County, Oregon
Festivals in Oregon
Annual events in Oregon
Aviation in Oregon
Summer events in the United States